A Khambo Lama is the title given to the senior lama of a Buddhist monastery in Mongolia and Russia. It is sometimes translated to the Christian title abbot.

It is the title of the spiritual leader of Buddhists in Buryatia (from the 18th century); the leaders of Buddhists in Tuva and Altai; and the head of Mongolian Buddhists.

It is derived from the Buddhist academic title Khenpo.

Current khambo lamas

Mongolia
Khambo lama of Gandantegchinlen Khiid - Khamba Lama, Gabju Demberelyn Choijamts

Russia
Buryatia - Pandito Hambo Lama XXIV - Damba Badmayevich Ayusheev
Tuva - Kamba Lama V of Tuva - Saldum Baska (Tsultim Tenzin)
Altai - Hambo Lama - Mergen Vasilyevich Shagayev

Gallery

See also
Buddhism in Mongolia
Buddhism in Russia
Buddhism in Buryatia
Buddhism in Kalmykia

References 
 Чимитдоржин, Г. Г. Институт Пандито Хамбо лам. 1764—2004: сборник биографической информации/Буддийская Традицион. Сангха России, Буддийский ин-т «Даши Чойнхорлин». Ин-т монголоведения, буддологии и тибетологии СО РАН. — Улан-Удэ: Изд-во буддийского ин-та «Даши Чойнхорлин», 2004. 

Tibetan Buddhist titles
Buddhism in Buryatia
Buddhism in Mongolia
Gelug Lamas